Patrick Ginley (December 11, 1822 – April 5, 1917) was a Union Army soldier in the American Civil War who received the U.S. military's highest decoration, the Medal of Honor.

Ginley was born in Ireland, and entered service at Woodside, Queens, in New York City. He was awarded the Medal of Honor, for extraordinary heroism shown in Dinwiddie County, Virginia, for bravery in action during the Second Battle of Ream's Station, while serving as a Private with Company F, 2nd U.S. Artillery. His Medal of Honor was issued on October 31, 1890.

Ginley died at the age of 94, on April 5, 1917 and was buried in the Calvary Cemetery in Queens, New York.

Medal of Honor citation

References

External links

1837 births
1912 deaths
American Civil War recipients of the Medal of Honor
Burials at Calvary Cemetery (Queens)
Irish-born Medal of Honor recipients
Irish emigrants to the United States (before 1923)
People from Queens, New York
Union Army soldiers
United States Army Medal of Honor recipients